Jack Edwards Livesey (11 June 1901 – 12 October 1961) was a British film actor.

He was born in Barry, Vale of Glamorgan, the son of Sam Livesey, the brother of Barry Livesey, and the cousin and step-brother of Roger Livesey.  He died in Burbank, California, aged 60.

On stage he appeared in the hit West End musical The Lisbon Story from 1943 to 1944.

In 1960, he portrayed Gillespie MacKenzie in an episode of the Western series Maverick titled "Cruise of the Cynthia B" starring James Garner and Mona Freeman. Garner's character (Bret Maverick) finds him hanging from a tree in the opening scene, cuts him down, and subsequently regrets it.

Partial filmography

 The Divine Gift (1918)
 La mille et deuxième nuit (1933) - Prince Tahar (English version, voice)
 The Wandering Jew (1933) - Godfrey - Duke of Normandy
 Song of the Plough (1933) - Squire's Son
 The Warren Case (1934) - Husband In Nightclub (uncredited)
 The Passing of the Third Floor Back (1935) - Mr. Larkcom
 Variety (1935) - Matt Boyd
 The Howard Case (1936) - Jerry
 Rembrandt (1936) - Journeyman
 It's Never Too Late to Mend (1937) - Tom Robinson
 Behind Your Back (1937) - Archie Bentley
 First Night (1937) - Richard Garnet
 Murder Tomorrow (1938) - Peter Wilton
 Penny Paradise (1938) - Bert
 Old Bones of the River (1938) - Capt. Hamilton
 Bedtime Story (1938) - Sir John Shale
 The World Owes Me a Living (1945) - Jack Graves
 The First Gentleman (1948) - Edward
 Murder at the Windmill (1949) - Vivian Van Damm
 Paul Temple's Triumph (1950) - Sir Graham Forbes
 Patterns of Power (1956) - Mr. Vandeventer
 Midnight Lace (1960) - Policeman (uncredited)
 The Notorious Landlady (1962) - Counsel (uncredited)
 That Touch of Mink (1962) - Doctor Richardson

References

External links
 

1901 births
1961 deaths
People from Barry, Vale of Glamorgan
Welsh male film actors
20th-century Welsh male actors